Battle of Lier may refer to two battles between Sweden and Norway in the Lier entrenchment, Norway:
Battle of Lier (1808)
Battle of Lier (1814)